Hitchen is a surname. Notable people with the surname include:

Brian Hitchen (1936–2013), British publisher and newspaper editor
Cedric Hitchen (1905–1975), English cricketer and chemist
Charles Hitchen (c. 1675 – 1727), English mobster
Steve Hitchen (born 1976), English footballer
Trevor Hitchen (born 1926), English footballer and manager
William Thomas Hitchen, Australian Army soldier

See also
Hitchens